Ulidiini is a tribe of picture-winged flies in the family Ulidiidae that live in the arid and sub arid regions of the Palaearctic. There are three genera and around 100 species within the tribe. The tribe was first named in 1835; its type genus is Ulidia.

Species in tribe Ulidiini are small and mostly black and brown in color. They can be distinguished from other tribes of the family Ulidiidae by the apical structure of the phallus.

Genera in the tribe Ulidiini include:
Physiphora Fallén, 1810
Timia Wiedemann, 1824
Ulidia Meigen, 1826

References

Ulidiidae
Insect tribes
Taxa described in 1835